Andy Fleming, also known as Slackbastard, is the pseudonym of an Australian anarcho-communist journalist, academic, and activist, known for his study of far-right parties and movements in Australia. Fleming has also been involved with a radio program on 3CR, a community radio station in Melbourne, Australia.

Fleming's blog Slackbastard has reportedly received 7.5 million views since its foundation in 2005. He has studied nationalist groups such as the United Patriots Front and Reclaim Australia.

He is known for his doxxing of far-right groups in Australia. As of 2014, Fleming remains anonymous despite attempts to identity him.

Bibliography
Rydgren, J., Fleming, A., & Mondon, A. (2018). The Radical Right in Australia. In The Oxford Handbook of the Radical Right.

References

Living people
Anonymous bloggers
Anti-fascists
Australian activists
Australian anarchists
Australian bloggers
Australian communists
21st-century Australian journalists
Writers from Melbourne
Year of birth missing (living people)
21st-century pseudonymous writers